Shaedon Sharpe (born May 30, 2003) is a Canadian professional basketball player for the Portland Trail Blazers of the National Basketball Association (NBA). He was a consensus five-star recruit and considered one of the top players in his class at Dream City Christian School in Glendale, Arizona. Sharpe signed with Kentucky but did not play a college game before leaving for the NBA. He was selected seventh overall in the 2022 NBA draft.

High school career
Sharpe played basketball for H. B. Beal Secondary School in his hometown of London, Ontario and led his team to an Ontario Federation of School Athletic Associations AAA appearance. He moved to Sunrise Christian Academy in Bel Aire, Kansas, where he had a limited production as a sophomore. For his junior season, Sharpe transferred to Dream City Christian School in Glendale, Arizona and assumed a leading role. He averaged 21.4 points and six rebounds per game in the Grind Session. He competed for UPLAY Canada on the Amateur Athletic Union circuit, with whom he was mentored by Dwayne Washington.

Recruiting
Sharpe was a consensus five-star recruit and was ranked as the third-best player in the 2021 class by 247Sports and Rivals. He was previously the number one player in the 2022 class before reclassifying. Sharpe was unranked by major recruiting services early in his high school career and became one of the top players in his class in about one year, in part due to his success at the Nike Elite Youth Basketball League in 2021. On September 7, 2021, he committed to playing college basketball for Kentucky over offers from Arizona, Kansas, Oklahoma State and the NBA G League Ignite. He was the first number one recruit to commit to the program since Nerlens Noel in 2012.

College career
Sharpe graduated early from high school with the intention of redshirting his first year at Kentucky and playing in the 2022–23 season. On February 7, 2022, head coach John Calipari announced that Sharpe would not play for the team in the 2021–22 season after speculation that he would play and enter the 2022 NBA draft, for which he was eligible. On April 21, Sharpe declared for the 2022 draft, forgoing his remaining college eligibility without playing a game.

Professional career

Portland Trail Blazers (2022–present)
Sharpe was selected with the seventh overall pick in the 2022 NBA draft by the Portland Trail Blazers. He joined the 6th overall pick, Bennedict Mathurin, as the only Canadians drafted in the first round that year. On July 1, 2022, he signed his rookie scale contract with the Trail Blazers. On July 8, in his NBA Summer League debut, Sharpe suffered a shoulder injury after under six minutes of play. An MRI later revealed a small labral tear in his left shoulder, and Sharpe was unable to play for the rest of the Summer League. On October 19, he made his NBA debut, scoring 12 points in a 115–108 win over the Sacramento Kings.

National team career
Sharpe represented Canada at the 2019 FIBA Under-16 Americas Championship in Brazil. He averaged 13 points, 3.7 rebounds, and 2.3 assists, helping his team win the silver medal.

References

External links
Kentucky Wildcats bio

2003 births
Living people
Basketball people from Ontario
Canadian expatriate basketball people in the United States
National Basketball Association players from Canada
Canadian men's basketball players
Portland Trail Blazers draft picks
Portland Trail Blazers players
Shooting guards
Sportspeople from London, Ontario